Cull's Harbour is a settlement in Newfoundland and Labrador.

Culls Harbour is located not far from Traytown and Glovertown in Newfoudnland and Labrador. It has one road, named Main Road.
Culls Harbour is home to about 5300 residents. It is also the location of the Parish of The Sacred heart, a Catholic Parish.

Populated places in Newfoundland and Labrador